Monopis typhlopa is a species of moth in the family Tineidae. It was described by Edward Meyrick in 1925. This species is endemic to New Zealand.

References

External links
Image of type specimen of Monopis typhlopa

Moths described in 1925
Tineinae
Moths of New Zealand
Endemic fauna of New Zealand
Taxa named by Edward Meyrick